Memorial Stadium, nicknamed The Sea of Red, is an American football stadium located on the campus of the University of Nebraska–Lincoln in Lincoln, Nebraska. The stadium primarily serves as the home venue for the Nebraska Cornhuskers. 

Memorial Stadium was built in 1923 at a cost of $450,000 and a capacity of 31,080 to replace Nebraska Field, where the Cornhuskers played home games from 1909 to 1922. The first game at the new stadium was a 24–0 Nebraska victory over Oklahoma on October 13, 1923. A series of expansions raised the stadium's capacity to 85,458, but attendance numbers have in the past exceeded 90,000. Nebraska has sold out an NCAA-record 389 consecutive games at Memorial Stadium, a streak that dates back to 1962.

Construction

In 1909, the University of Nebraska constructed Nebraska Field on the corner of North 10th Street and T Street in downtown Lincoln, the school's first football-only stadium. However, its wooden construction meant and limited seating capacity meant that after less than ten years there was significant momentum toward the building of a larger steel-and-concrete stadium for the Cornhuskers. The abrupt departure of highly successful head coach Ewald O. Stiehm temporarily slowed this momentum, but by the early 1920s, with "the present athletic field as inadequate now as the old one was in 1907," the university began plans to build a new stadium on the site of Nebraska Field. 

The new stadium project was initially conceived as a combination gymnasium-stadium-war museum complex to be called the "Nebraska Soldiers and Sailors Memorial." Enthusiasm for the fundraising effort was high following the death of former Nebraska football captain Dusty Rhodes, who was killed in action in France during World War I. Due to a slow post-war economy, the scope of the project was decreased to just a football stadium (though the Nebraska Coliseum was ultimately completed next door to Memorial Stadium just three years later). John Latenser Sr. of Omaha and Ellery Davis of Lincoln were selected as the head architects for the new stadium as they were willing to work pro bono. When the fundraising target amount of $450,000 had been met, construction began and a groundbreaking ceremony was held on April 23, 1923. Construction was completed on the 31,000-seat stadium in just over ninety days, in time for NU's first home game of the 1923 season, a 24–0 win over Oklahoma on October 13. Memorial Stadium was dedicated the following week to honor Nebraskans who served in the American Civil War and the Spanish–American War, and the 751 Nebraskans who died in World War I. Later, the dedication was expanded to honor Nebraskans who died in World War II, the Korean War, and the Vietnam War.

Each corner of the stadium was given an inscription from philosophy professor Hartley Burr Alexander:
Southeast: "In Commemoration of the men of Nebraska who served and fell in the Nation's Wars."
Southwest: "Not the victory but the action; Not the goal but the game; In the deed the glory."
Northwest: "Courage; Generosity; Fairness; Honor; In these are the true awards of manly sport."
Northeast: "Their Lives they held their country's trust; They kept its faith; They died its heroes."

The stadium, in its original layout, had open end zones and grandstands on the east and west sides of the field with seating for up to 31,080 fans. A track surrounded the playing field for use by the school's track and field program.

Expansion
Memorial Stadium remained largely unchanged for over a decade after its 1923 opening, and by the mid-1930s the university began planning to build extra football facilities along the stadium's north end zone. After struggling for years to acquire the necessary land in the adjoining neighborhood, construction finally began in 1941, only to be quickly halted due to the United States' entry into World War II. Construction resumed after the war ended and the Schulte Fieldhouse was completed in 1946, providing locker rooms, extra practice facilities, and showers to the football program. The Fieldhouse was named for former football and longtime track and field coach Henry Schulte, who died in 1944 while construction was paused. The building was used by the program until 2006, when the Osborne Athletic Complex was constructed on the site.

The stadium's first expansion from its original capacity of 31,080 came in 1964, when permanent seats were added to the south end zone, turning the stadium into a 48,000-seat horseshoe. The north end zone was enclosed in two stages from 1965 to 1966, bringing the stadium's capacity to 64,170. A press box was added in 1967 and the south end zone was expanded further in 1972, raising capacity to 73,650.

In the early 1980s, portable lighting was occasionally used to allow Memorial Stadium to host late afternoon games on national television, often against Oklahoma. The first official night game at Memorial Stadium took place on September 6, 1986, when Nebraska defeated Florida State 34–17. Permanent lighting was installed in 1999, which was replaced with an LED lighting system in 2018.

In the mid-1990s the university began a wide-ranging, $36-million expansion of West Stadium, adding luxury boxes, a larger press box, a stadium lounge, and a new façade facing Stadium Drive; the expansion raised the stadium's capacity to 74,056. It was re-dedicated on April 24, 1998, months after Tom Osborne retired from coaching, as "Tom Osborne Field at Memorial Stadium." While this construction was ongoing, former quarterback Brook Berringer was killed in a plane crash on April 18, 1996, just two days before the 1996 NFL Draft, where he was projected to be an early- to mid-round pick. Berringer, a Scottsbluff, Nebraska native, was beloved for starting and winning several crucial games in place of injured starter Tommie Frazier during NU's  1994 national championship-winning season. A statue of Osborne and Berringer was commissioned and installed at the main entrance of the Osborne Athletic Complex on the north side of the stadium.

Construction began in 2004 to renovate and expand the north end zone, adding an additional 6,000 seats and thirteen luxury boxes called "Skyline Suites," which brought the stadium's capacity to 81,067. At the time of its completion, the 33-foot (10 m) tall, 120-foot (37 m) wide scoreboard at Memorial Stadium was the largest in any college football stadium. Before the 2009 season, two new high-definition video screens were added on the northeast and northwest pillars of the original stadium. Concurrently, ribbon boards stretching the length of the field were installed along the east and west balconies of the stadium.

On October 15, 2010, the university announced its Board of Regents approved an East Stadium expansion project anticipated to cost up to $65 million, increasing the stadium's capacity to 87,147. This expansion included 3,300 new general admission seats, 2,119 new club seats and thirty-eight additional luxury suites. The expansion totaled more than 6,000 new seats and brought the number of private suites inside the stadium to 101. The original east façade of the stadium was preserved within a new entrance lobby. The expansion included creation of the first standing room-only area in Memorial Stadium, and was made available for companies and private parties to host events on a game-to-game basis. The university constructed two  research facilities inside the new East Stadium, one dedicated to athletics and one to campus research. The project was completed and dedicated on August 22, 2013. The project was initially voted on by fans and donors, who were asked whether the university should prioritize stadium expansion or the preservation of the stadium's NCAA-record sellout streak; the most-supported option was a modest expansion designed to protect the streak while adding some general admission seats. A statue of former head coach Bob Devaney was unveiled at the entrance of the newly renovated East Stadium and unveiled just before Nebraska's 2013 season opener against Wyoming; Nebraska and Wyoming were the only schools where Devaney served as a head coach at the collegiate level.

Prior to the 2014 season, Nebraska completed a $12.3 million project to replace Memorial Stadium's twenty-year-old sound system and add a wireless network system to provide Wi-Fi to fans. A brick pattern was added to the base of West Stadium to match the appearance of the rest of the stadium and surrounding academic buildings. Nebraska installed new videoboards at Memorial Stadium prior to the 2017 season, two of which were wrapped around the existing structure to allow fans in North Stadium, seated directly in front of the stadium's largest videoboard, clear screen viewing. An upper ribbon display was added to the second level of East Stadium.

In 2015, the university replaced the bleachers along the top sections of the North Stadium, widening the seats from eighteen to twenty-two inches. Some seats were removed in the southwest corner of the stadium to allow for a new aisle to aid crowd congestion. This removed about 1,100 seats from Memorial Stadium. Two years later, the university increased the width of seating in several other areas of the stadium, reducing official stadium capacity to 85,458.

Seating capacity
1923: 31,080
1964: 48,000 – south end zone bleachers erected
1965: 52,455 – center section of north end zone bleachers erected
1966: 62,644 – rest of north stadium bleachers finished
1967: 64,170 – new press box installed
1972: 73,650 – south end zone bleachers extended
1994: 72,700 – handicapped seating installed
1999: 74,056 – new West Stadium press box, skyboxes, and club seating completed
2000: 73,918 – additional club seating installed
2006: 81,067 – North Stadium bleachers extended, new skyboxes and handicap seating installed
2013: 87,147 – East Stadium expansion completed with new skyboxes, club seating, and general admission seating
2015: 86,047 – north end zone seats widened, some seats in southwest corner removed for addition of crowd control aisle
2017: 85,458 – seats widened throughout stadium

Playing surface

Nebraska played on natural grass from 1923, when Memorial Stadium was completed, through 1969. In 1970, as part of head coach Bob Devaney's crusade to improve athletic facilities across the university, the stadium was fit with AstroTurf, an artificial turf glued to a foam plastic layer on a  bed of asphalt. The Huskers won consecutive national championships in 1970 and 1971.

Several iterations of AstroTurf were installed at Memorial Stadium until 1999, when it became the first Division I-A venue to install FieldTurf. A second FieldTurf installation featuring an alternating light-and-dark green pattern every five yards was installed prior to the 2005 season; at the same time, the playing surface's prominent crown was reduced. A third FieldTurf iteration was installed in 2013, featuring a "lighter and cooler" playing surface by adding cork to the traditional top layer of recycled tire pellets.

1923–69: Natural grass
1970–83: AstroTurf
1984–91: All-Pro Turf
1992–98: AstroTurf-9
1999–present: FieldTurf

Attendance

Nebraska has sold out 389 consecutive games at Memorial Stadium, the longest streak in any collegiate sport. The streak began on November 3, 1962, a 16–7 Missouri win over Nebraska in Bob Devaney's first season as head coach. NU's home record during the sellout streak is 315–67, including a forty-seven game home winning streak from 1991 to 1998, the second-longest in modern college football history.

Longest home winning streaks

High School Championships
Since 1996, Memorial Stadium has been the host for the Nebraska School Activities Association's state high school football championship finals, including smaller schools that play eight-man football, which is played on fields smaller than standard size; the state's six-man football championship finals are played at University of Nebraska at Kearney's Cope Stadium. Prior to the move to Memorial Stadium, finals for each class were contested on the home fields of the high schools involved.

References

External links

 

College football venues
Nebraska Cornhuskers football
John Latenser Sr. buildings
Tourist attractions in Lincoln, Nebraska
American football venues in Nebraska
Spanish–American War memorials in the United States
1923 establishments in Nebraska
Sports venues completed in 1923